Suresh Tak (bor June 1, 1962) is a businessman and a member of the 15th Rajasthan Legislative Assembly representing the constituency of Kishangarh. He won representation to the state's assembly in the elections held in 2018 as an independent candidate.

References 

Living people
1962 births
Rajasthan MLAs 2018–2023

Rajasthan politician stubs